Barga Jazz is a long-running jazz festival. The 26th edition of the festival was in 2013. It takes place in the medieval town of Barga, in the province of Lucca, in  Tuscany, central Italy.

The Jazz festival features a competition for arrangements and compositions for the Barga Jazz Orchestra.

References

External links
History of Festival

 2006 - Bruno Tommaso
 2005 - Wayne Shorter
 2004 - Giorgio Gaslini
 2003 - Lee Konitz
 2002 - Thelonious Monk
 2001 - Gianluigi Trovesi

Music festivals established in 1977
Jazz festivals in Italy
Tourist attractions in Tuscany
Bargaining theory
Barga, Tuscany